Sironen is a Finnish surname. Notable people with the surname include:

 Paul Sironen (born 1965), Australian professional rugby league player
 Curtis Sironen (born 1993), Australian professional rugby league player
 Bayley Sironen (born 1996), Australian professional rugby league player

Finnish-language surnames